{{DISPLAYTITLE:C30H42O7}}
The molecular formula C30H42O7 (molar mass: 514.65 g/mol, exact mass: 514.2931 u) may refer to:

 Angustifodilactone
 Stigmatellin

Molecular formulas